Karl Tekusch (7 July 1890 – 28 December 1977) was an Austrian footballer. He played in 15 matches for the Austria national football team from 1908 to 1918. He was also part of Austria's squad for the football tournament at the 1912 Summer Olympics, but he did not play in any matches.

References

External links
 

1890 births
1977 deaths
Austrian footballers
Austria international footballers
Association football midfielders
Wiener AF players
Wiener AC players